St Nicholas' Church is a Church of England church in Abbotsbury, Dorset, England. The earliest parts of the church date to the 14th century origin, with later alterations and extensions over the following centuries, including the construction of the west tower and north chapel in the 15th century. The church underwent restoration in 1807–08, 1885 and 1930.

The church's porch contains the effigy of an abbot of Abbotsbury Abbey. It was discovered on the site of the Abbey's church, St Peter's, in 1778, and has been given an approximate date of 1200. The Jacobean pulpit contains two bullet holes stemming from a fight in 1664, during the English Civil War, when Parliamentarians besieged Royalists at the church.

St Nicholas' has been Grade I listed since 1956. In 2015, the World War I memorial in the churchyard, dating to around 1920, became Grade II listed.

References

External links
 
 Chesil Churches website

Churches in Dorset
Grade I listed churches in Dorset
Church of England church buildings in Dorset